Puren may refer to:

 Purén, city in Chile
 Puren River
 Jin Youzhi (1918–2015), brother of Puyi, the last Emperor of China
 Puren, verb in Finnish, "I bite"